Plus (formerly Plus GSM) is the brand name of Poland's mobile phone network operator, Polkomtel Sp. z o.o. The company is entirely owned by Cyfrowy Polsat S.A. and is part of Grupa Polsat Plus. It operates GSM (900/1800 MHz), UMTS, LTE, 5G NR (2600 MHz TDD) and WLAN networks in Poland. It was founded in 1995.

At the end of September 2021, Plus had 13.045 million active SIM cards, including 2.486 million (19%) using the prepaid system.

In July 2011, Zygmunt Solorz-Żak agreed to buy Polkomtel SA for 15.1 billion PLN ($5.5 billion).

External links
 https://www.plus.pl/news/aboutcompany Polkomtel Sp. z o.o. Corporate Website

References

Mobile phone companies of Poland
Companies based in Warsaw
Telecommunications companies established in 1995
Polish brands